Minuscule 2616 (in the Gregory-Aland numbering), is a Greek minuscule manuscript of the New Testament, written on 280 parchment leaves (17.7 cm by 12.9 cm). Paleographically it has been assigned to the 12th century.

Description 
The codex contains the complete text of the four Gospels. The text is written in two columns per page, in 21 lines per page. Numbered only on the recto of leaf. The title in Mark is written in red semi-uncial letters, in rest of the Gospels in red uncial letters. It contains the Ammonian Sections and references to the Eusebian Canons.

Kurt Aland the Greek text of the codex did not place in any Category.
According to the Claremont Profile Method it represents the textual family Kx in Luke 1 and Luke 20. In Luke 10 it has a mixture of the Byzantine textual families.

History 

The codex now is located in the Kenneth Willis Clark Collection of the Duke University (Gk MS 16)  at Durham.

See also 

 List of New Testament minuscules
 Biblical manuscript
 Textual criticism

References

Further reading 

 Clark Kenneth Willis, "Greek New Testament Manuscripts in Duke University Library", Library Notes, no. 27 (April 1953), pp. 6–7. 
 Caspar Rene Gregory, "Textkritik des Neuen Testamentes", Leipzig J. C. Hinrichs'sche Buchhandlung, 1900–1909.

External links 

 Minuscule 2616 at the Kenneth Willis Clark Collection of Greek Manuscripts

Greek New Testament minuscules
12th-century biblical manuscripts
Duke University Libraries